Vladimir Moiseyev (born 26 March 1972) is a Russian windsurfer. He competed at the 1996 Summer Olympics, the 2000 Summer Olympics, and the 2004 Summer Olympics.

References

1972 births
Living people
Russian male sailors (sport)
Russian windsurfers
Olympic sailors of Russia
Sailors at the 1996 Summer Olympics – Mistral One Design
Sailors at the 2000 Summer Olympics – Mistral One Design
Sailors at the 2004 Summer Olympics – Mistral One Design
Sportspeople from Taganrog